Vlasta Neighborhood (in ) is a set of buildings in Prague 10-Vršovice, Czech Republic. It was constructed across from the Koh-i-noor factory between 1972 and 1977. There are residential buildings and the seat of the Municipality of Prague 10. The buildings were established as a quick fix solution following the Warsaw Pact invasion of Czechoslovakia in 1968 for residents of the evacuated city of Milovice.

Buildings and structures in Prague
Prague 10
1977 establishments in Czechoslovakia
20th-century architecture in the Czech Republic